The 1974 Japan rugby union tour of New Zealand was a series of 10 matches played in April and May 1974 in New Zealand by the Japan national rugby union team. It was the first visit of a Japanese team in New Zealand. They did not play against the All Blacks, but two matches against the New Zealand Universities team and the Junior All Blacks, which was at that time an Under-23 selection. These three matches were recognized as test matches by the Japanese Rugby Union team.

Results

References
 *

Note

Japan
tour
Japan national rugby union team tours
tour
Rugby union tours of New Zealand